Alan Rice (born June 2, 1928) is an American wrestler. He competed in the men's Greco-Roman featherweight at the 1956 Summer Olympics.

References

1928 births
Living people
American male sport wrestlers
Olympic wrestlers of the United States
Wrestlers at the 1956 Summer Olympics
Sportspeople from Saint Paul, Minnesota
Pan American Games medalists in wrestling
Pan American Games silver medalists for the United States
Wrestlers at the 1955 Pan American Games
20th-century American people
21st-century American people